Lewis McArthur may refer to:
 Lewis Linn McArthur, American newspaper publisher, attorney, and state judge
 Lewis A. McArthur, American business executive, geographer, and author